Aishwary Pratap Singh Tomar (born 3 February 2001) is an Indian sport shooter. He won the bronze medal in the 50 metre rifle three positions event at the 2019 Asian Shooting Championships and secured a quota place for India at the 2020 Summer Olympics.

Early life
Tomar was born on 3 February 2001 in Ratanpur village, Khargone district, Madhya Pradesh, into a Tomar Rajput family of farmers, as the youngest of three children. He often went hunting with his father Veer Bahadur, a landlord, and learned about sport shooting from his cousin Navdeep Singh Rathore. Tomar started to receive training in 2015 at the Madhya Pradesh Shooting Academy in Bhopal.

Career

Tomar won the bronze medal at the 2019 Asian Airgun Championships in the junior 10 metre air rifle event. At the 2019 ISSF Junior World Cup in Suhl, Tomar set the junior world record in the 50 metre rifle three positions with a score of 459.3 and won the gold medal.

Tomar won the bronze medal in 50 metre rifle three positions at the 2019 Asian Shooting Championships in Doha, scoring 449.1 in the final. He thus secured India's second 2020 Summer Olympics quota place in the event and 13th overall in shooting. He bagged bronze in the team event of the same discipline, along with Chain Singh and Parul Kumar.

Tomar bagged gold at the 2021 ISSF World Cup event in New Delhi with a score of 462.5 in men's 50 metre rifle three positions. He scored 155 points in kneeling and 310.5 in prone before the standing elimination round, and earned qualification for the 2020 Summer Olympics.

Aishwary clinched gold in 50m Rifle three positions men's event with a new junior world record at the 2021 ISSF Junior World Championships held in Lima, Peru.

Awards 
 2019: Eklavya Award by Government of Madhya Pradesh on National Sports Day

References

External links
 
 
 

2001 births
Living people
Indian male sport shooters
Olympic shooters of India
Shooters at the 2020 Summer Olympics
Sport shooters from Madhya Pradesh
People from Khargone district
21st-century Indian people